Sandwick Lake is a lake in Itasca County, in the U.S. state of Minnesota. Zaiser Island, which was donated to Scenic State Park by the park's first superintendent and his family, sits on the lake.

Sandwick Lake was named for John A. Sandwick, an early settler.

See also
List of lakes in Minnesota

References

Lakes of Minnesota
Lakes of Itasca County, Minnesota